Abinger is a large, well-wooded and mostly rural civil parish that lies between the settlements of Dorking, Shere and Ewhurst in the district of Mole Valley, Surrey, England. 

It adjoins Wotton Common on the same side of Leith Hill and includes Abinger Hammer, Sutton Abinger, Abinger Common, Forest Green, Walliswood, Oakwood Hill and some outskirts of Holmbury St Mary. More than half of the parish lies on the Greensand Ridge, while the remainder is divided between the Vale of Holmesdale and the North Downs.

Geography 

Abinger, including the dependent villages of Forest Green and Walliswood, ranks third in size in Surrey after Farnham and Cranleigh. Its list of localities is as set out in the introduction and make up what is called a strip parish reaching from the North Downs to the border of West Sussex, the only parish in Surrey to do so. The entire area is in the Surrey Hills AONB.

Streams and forest
The upper reach of the Tilling Bourne runs through Abinger Hammer from east to west and is joined by the Holmbury St Mary stream on the western border. In the southwest by Sutton Abinger are Pasture Wood and Oxmoor Copse, lower forested slopes of the Greensand Ridge, projections from the Winterfold/Hurt Wood forest.

Hills

Transport 

 Roads  Abinger Hammer lies on the A25 Guildford to Dorking road, while the remainder of the area is served by more minor roads.

 Rail  The nearest railway station is to the west at Gomshall on the North Downs Line from Reading to Gatwick.

History 

A mesolithic burial site on the south east of Abinger Common is testament to the long time in which the area has been inhabited. There is also evidence of strip farming. Remains of a Romano-British villa, a Scheduled Ancient Monument, lie approximately 120 m east of Abinger Hall stables.

Abinger is recorded in Domesday Book as Abinceborne held by William son of Ansculf. It was assessed for tax at 6 hides in 1066 and 4 hides by 1086. There was land for 9 plough teams with 2 plough teams working the lord's land. There were 10 villagers and 7 smallholders with a further 5 plough teams. There was a church and 5 slaves, 1 mill worth 6 s, 3 acres of meadow; and from woodland and pasture the manor rendered 40 pigs. The total value in 1066 was £8, and when acquired by William son of Ansculf and in 1086 was £7. 

The church of the Abingers is the C of E church of St James at Abinger Common, which is a II* class listed building whose nave is 11th century, chancel and north chapel built 1220 CE, reconstructed in 1857, damaged by a V1 flying bomb in 1944, and restored 1950 by Frederick Etchells. The headquarters of the Lutyens Trust is based in the village at Goddards (designed by Sir Edwin Lutyens). Lutyens also designed Abinger Common War Memorial. Opposite the church is the 19th century Evelyn Hall which has recently been completely refurbished and can be hired for events. To the west of the village is Oxmoor Copse which is an Area of Outstanding Natural Beauty.

The church of St John the Baptist in Walliswood also has class II* listed building status.

Abinger Hammer contains two grade II* listed buildings, Paddington farmhouse, which is 15th century, listed as possibly earlier, extended in the 16th century, which is also whitewashed; and Crossways farmhouse built 1610, clad in sandstone blocks with brick dressings with a panelled 17th century door. Crossways is the setting for George Meredith's 1885 novel, Diana of the Crossways.

Fulvens House, which also lies between the Abingers, is actually over the western border and it may date back to 1628.

Demographics, economy and housing 

In 2001, Abinger had a population of 1,858 in 717 households. Of the population 12.2% were aged over 65; 3.8% of the population were in full-time further education; 85.1% of all men were economically active whereas 2.8% were unemployed, 6.1% worked part-time; 60% of all women were economically active whereas 2.7% were unemployed, 34.6% worked part-time.

As to ethnicity, 99.94% of the population identified themselves as being white, 6 residents identified with one of the other main categories.

In terms of religion, 77.7%% of the population responded as being Christian, 0% as Muslim, 0.8% other religions, 13.7% as atheist and 8.2% declined to answer.

Abinger's economy is predominantly one in the service sector reflected by a low concentration at one end of the official categorisation table of occupation stated, compiled from the 2001 census:

Whereas 25.5% of the population worked in lower managerial and professional occupations and 9.2% in higher professional occupations.

Housing and home ownership 

The average level of accommodation in the region composed of detached houses was 28%, the average that was apartments was 22.6%.

The proportion of households in the civil parish who owned their home outright compares to the regional average of 35.1%.  The proportion who owned their home with a loan compares to the regional average of 32.5%.  The remaining % is made up of rented dwellings (plus a negligible % of households living rent-free).

Education 

Abinger Common First School merged with Westcott School in 2010 to become a two-site all-through primary school.

Sport and amenities 

Cricket is played across the parish, with a notable team at Abinger Hammer.

There are three village halls with activities and events and three playgrounds across the parish.

Other than the public houses listed above, there is also the Abinger Arms (see Baron Abinger in Abinger Hammer) and the Scarlett Arms in Walliswood.

Notable residents 
 Baron Abinger
 E.M. Forster lived at West Hackhurst, Abinger Hammer, 1925–1945
 Prunella Scales was born in Sutton Abinger in 1932.
 Arthur Brooke, the Brooke Bond tea founder, lived in Abinger Common

See also 
 List of places of worship in Mole Valley

References

External links 

 Stained Glass Windows at St. James Abinger, Surrey
 St James's Church, Abinger
 
 

Mole Valley
Villages in Surrey
Civil parishes in Surrey